Bucharest has the largest transport network in Romania, and one of the largest in Europe. The Bucharest transport network is made up of a metro network and a surface transport network. Although there are multiple connection points, the two systems operate independently of each other, are run by different organisations (the metro is run by Metrorex and the surface transport network by Societatea de Transport București. The two companies used separate ticketing systems until 2021, when a new smartcard was introduced alongside the old tickets, which allows travel on both the STB and the Underground.

Bucharest Metro

Bucharest has a fairly extensive metro system consisting of five lines (M1, M2, M3, M4, and M5) run by Metrorex. It is one of the fastest ways to get around the city.

Surface transport
Surface transport in Bucharest is run by Societatea de Transport București (STB) and consists of an extensive network of buses, trolleybuses, trams and light rail. The STB network is one of the densest in Europe, and the fourth largest on the continent, carrying about 1.7 million passengers daily on 85 bus lines, 23 tram lines, 2 light rail lines and 15 trolleybus lines. At times, however, it suffers from severe overcrowding.

STB is a reasonably efficient and a very frequently-used way of getting around Bucharest. As with the Metro, the system is undergoing a period of renewal. Some new features are the upgrade of tram/trolleybus infrastructure and the replacement of old rolling stock.

Buses

There are 85 bus lines (plus 25 night routes) operating mostly in the municipality of Bucharest, as well as 27 bus lines serving commuters from surrounding towns and villages in Ilfov County. In mid-2005, the lines that linked the city to the peripheral area were licensed out to independent transportation providers, but in early 2006, they were returned to STB control due to a wide range customer complaints about the private operators. Sometime in 2010, all the STB lines of the peripheral network were removed, leading to an increase in minivans owned by private transport companies, and so far only a few of these lines have been put back.

Fleet
STB's bus fleet is made up of 1,143 vehicles (2018), which are all wheelchair-accessible (low floor) and around 55% are air-conditioned. The fleet utilisation rate during workdays stood at 78.1% in 2018.

Between 2005 and 2009, the fleet underwent its most substantial renewal since 1989, and is now among the most modern in Europe. In December 2005, STB signed a contract for 500 Mercedes Citaro low-floor, wheelchair-accessible buses. The buses were delivered between June 2006 and April 2007. In January 2008, the first of a further series of 500 Citaro low-floor buses were put into service.

The fleet makeup, as of 2019, is as follows, with years of delivery shown in brackets:

Central Lines are usually populated by Otokar and Hybrid buses, while lines connecting rezidential areas tend to use the older Citaro models.

Trolleybuses

During the 1990s, the fleet was updated with modern trolleybuses manufactured by Ikarus, in light blue and yellow livery, which have acoustic station announcements and digital display screens. These trolleybuses now make up the majority of the fleet. In early 2007, 100 wheelchair-accessible Irisbus Citelis trolleybuses were introduced on routes 61, 62, 69, 70, 86, 90, 91, and 92.

Two distinct, non-interconnected networks exist in Bucharest, the main network (comprising the two main east–west lines as well as a spur in the northern part of town) and a relatively small southern network in Berceni. Each of the networks has its own, separate trolleybus depots (including separate fleets) and is not connected to the other in any way, in 1987 being separated after the opening of M2 metro line. The trolleybus network is currently being overhauled or expanded — a goal is to eventually unite the two networks.

Fleet
In 2018, the STB had a fleet of 265 trolleybuses spread across 3 depots and 1 mixed tram-trolleybus depot. Most of them were Astra-Ikarus 415T (163 trolleybuses). The fleet utilisation rate during workdays stood at 61.8% in 2018.

Trams and light rail

Beside 23 tram lines, there are two converted light rail lines called metrou uşor ("light metro"), numbered 41 and 32, which serve the western and south-western parts of Bucharest. Both use upgraded trams running on separate designated corridors for faster travel times.

67% of the city's tram infrastructure had been modernised by 2018. The light rail service is expected to be expanded by upgrading existing tram lines to light rail status.

Most trams operated by STB (all V3A, Bucur 1 and Bucur LF models) are manufactured internally by STB at their subsidiary URAC Bucharest (the same subsidiary also handles tramway repairs and is in charge of scrapping vehicles reaching the end of their useful life). Currently, URAC produces three models for STB – two three-section, partially low-floor, wheelchair-accessible models (V3A-CH-PPC/CA-PPC derived from the earlier V3A-93 model and the all-new Bucur-LF model) as well as a two-section, non-wheelchair-accessible model (Bucur 1), made from scrapped Tatra axles with new equipment. It is uncertain if their production will continue, because as of now their production has been halted for the past 7 years.

Routes 1, 10, 21, 25, 32, 41 are wheelchair-accessible, using new V3A-93-M2000-PPC, V3A-CH-PPC and Bucur LF trams. Lines 3, 7, 8, 19, 23, 24, 27, 45 are also wheel chair accessible when V3A-93 PPC (3, 7, 19, 24, 45 - number is limited to 4 vehicles, 008, 164, 181 and 206 can be seen on these routes occasionally, the first two (008 and 164) mainly on routes 3, 24, 45 and the following two (181 and 206) on routes 7 and/or 19) or CA/CH-PPC are sent on these routes ( the latter mainly 8, 23 and 27 from Alexandria on 8 and Dudesti 23/27). Other routes (if most) will become wheelchair-accessible as soon as more V3A-CH-PPC or Bucur-LF vehicles are constructed (URAC's building and modernising capacity is limited).

Fleet
In 2018, the STB had a fleet of 486 trams, most of which were the V3A-M type (323 trams). The fleet is spread across 7 tram depots and 1 mixed tram-trolleybus depot. The fleet utilisation rate during workdays stood at 55.6% in 2018. In December 2022, the first 15 Astra Imperio Metropolitan trams (out of a total order of 100 units) were put into circulation.

Tickets 
Surface transportation, operated by STB uses a different ticketing system from the metro network, operated by Metrorex, a separate entity. Their tickets and prices can be found on their website, available in English as well. http://www.stbsa.ro/

They include subscriptions, rechargeable cards as well as single use cards. A simple metropolitan ticket valid on all surface lines for 90 minutes costs 3 RON and can be activated by tapping either a STB transit card or a contactless bank card on the ticket machines present inside all vehicles. Tickets can also be bought through SMS by sending a message to 7458, with the message "C", you will be charged 0.65 EUR + VAT. You can also purchase a 24-hour pass for 8 RON at any kiosk or by sending the message "AB" to the same number, costing you 1.5 EUR + VAT.

This method of SMS-based payment is also available through the app, InfoTB. The app can also plan routes using all types of transportation in the city, and show the GPS location of vehicles. Approximately 85% of vehicles are equipped with a GPS positioning system.

A separate app, 24Pay, can be used to pay for fares using a credit card.

An online account can also be created on the website, that allows clients to add credit to their STB cards.

BCR (Romanian Commercial Bank) ATMs also allow clients to recharge their physical cards with money.

Metrorex and STB have integrated tickets and passes, information which is available on their websites, but also on the Bucharest Metro page. An integrated fare costs 5 RON and can be used simultaneously on both surface lines and the metro, with a time limit of 120 minutes.

The Bucharest Metro uses a per-entry constant fare system, every entry costing 3 RON, regardless of stations travelled, time spent or zones used, changing lines doesn't require additional pay and is free, the only exception is Gara De Nord, where the 2 corresponding stations are separate and thus you are required to exit the system and pay again at the other station to transfer lines, tho free transfers from the M1 to the M4 can be done at the neighbouring Basarb station.

Passengers can purchase paper tickets loaded with 1, 2 or 10 fares or simply tap their contactless bank cards at the turnstiles, which will charge them 3 RON. Rechargeable contactless metro cards can also be issued and loaded with passes available for either a day, a week, a month or a year. The most commonly used pass is the 1 month pass priced at 80 RON.

Personal cars
At the end of 2008, in Bucharest there were 1.24 million vehicles, of which 985.000 were personal cars. In 2007 there were 150.000 fewer vehicles, which means the number of vehicles increased by 13.76% in one year.

With so many cars and a very high population density (50% higher than Tokyo and 4 times bigger than Rome for example), parking is a problem in Bucharest.

CFR Trains

In 2011, Bucharest had 99 km of railway lines, 79 of which were electric.

Bucharest has several train stations throughout and around the city, the main one being Gara de Nord where trains depart to all destinations. Other main stations include Baneasa, Obor and Basarab.

Gara de Nord is a relatively modern station. It was opened in 1872 and has undergone modernization and refurbishment several times. From here, trains leave to every destination in Romania and to other European cities. The other stations only see around five trains a day and are not considered "important" stations by CFR.

Bucharest was once home to a vast system of industrial railways that sprawled all over the city, linking factories to the surrounding neighbourhoods and towns. However most of these are now gone and what remains has fallen into disrepair. Therefore, Bucharest didn't have an RER/S-Bahn type of commuter network until 2019 when CFR introduced commuter trains between the city and Buftea. Attempts have been made in the past to introduce such a system, but so far not much has been achieved. It is true that there are trains operated by CFR from Bucharest to neighbouring towns, however due to long journey times and poor rolling stock most people tend to use personal cars to get into the city.

Road network

The city's municipal road network is centred on a series of high-capacity boulevards (6 to 10 lanes), which generally radiate out from the city centre to the outskirts and are arranged in geographical axes (principally north–south, east–west and northwest–southeast). The principal and thus most congested boulevards are Calea Victoriei, Bulevardul Unirii and Șoseaua Mihai Bravu, which is the longest in Bucharest and forms a sort of semicircle around the northeastern part of the old district. The city also has two ring roads, one internal (Mihai Bravu is part of it) and one external, which are mainly used for cars that bypass the city as well as trucks, which aren't allowed in the city centre, Works on a third ring road (the A0), which would be mainly used for transit and freight traffic around the city, began in 2020 on some segments. Aside from the main roads, the city also has a number of secondary roads, which connect the main boulevards. In the historical city centre, particularly the Lipscani area, many streets are cobbled and are classified as pedestrian zones.

The city's roads are usually very crowded during rush hours, due to an increase in car ownership in recent years. Every day, there are more than one million vehicles travelling within the city limits. This has resulted in wearing of the upper layer of tarmac on many of roads in Bucharest, particularly secondary roads which are now used in an equal amount, this being identified as one of Bucharest's main infrastructural problems. The pothole problem is notorious enough to have inspired a song by the band Taxi with a chorus "Cratere ca-n București, nici pe luna nu gaseşti!" ("Craters like in Bucharest you won't even find on the moon"). However, in recent years, there has been a comprehensive effort on behalf of the City Hall to boost improvement of road infrastructure, mainly by resurfacing and widening roads, and repairing footpaths. Faulty urban planning will likely lead to an increase in traffic and parking problems, since new housing areas are built with houses and apartment buildings literally squeezed into existing small grid roads, a problem commonly identified in the "suburbs" of the city.

Bucharest is one of the principal junctions of Romania's national road network, which links the city to all of Romania's major cities as well as to neighbouring countries such as Hungary, Bulgaria and Ukraine. Furthermore, the city is the starting point of the A1 motorway, towards Pitești, the A2, linking the capital with the country's ports and seaside resorts on the Black Sea and the A3, towards Ploiești.

Airports

Bucharest has one international airport: 
 Henri Coandă International Airport, located north of the Bucharest metropolitan area, in the town of Otopeni, Ilfov. Currently the airport has one terminal divided into three inter-connected buildings (International Departures Hall, International Arrivals Hall and the Domestic Flights Hall – at the ground level of the Arrivals Hall). The International Departures Hall consists of 36 check-in desks, one finger with 10 gates (5 equipped with jetways), while the Domestic Hall has an extra four gates. Today's International Arrivals Hall is the old Otopeni terminal, while the new Departures Hall, including the finger and the airbridges was built and inaugurated in 1997. A second finger with 7 jetways is under construction and a new building terminal on the east side is in project phase. The airport received 8,317,168 passengers in 2015. It is accessible by STB buses 783 and the future M6 underground line, which will link the airport with the main train station of Bucharest.
Until 2012 there was also another airport which is no longer used, except for charter/private flights:
Aurel Vlaicu International Airport is situated only 8 km north of the Bucharest city centre and is accessible by STB buses 131, 335, 605, 783 and taxi.

Water transport

Although it is situated on the banks of a river, Bucharest has never functioned as a port city, with other Romanian cities such as Constanţa and Brăila acting as the country's main ports. However, the Danube-Bucharest Canal, which is 73 km long, was under construction until 1990 and is not being worked on as of 2015. When eventually finished, the canal will link Bucharest to the Danube River and, via the Danube-Black Sea Canal, to the Black Sea. This transport corridor is expected to be a significant component of the city's transport infrastructure and increase sea traffic by a large margin.

Notes

External links

Official site of STB (surface transport operator)
Official site of Metrorex (subway transport operator)
Site that contains all about RATB, depots, vehicles, news 
Site that contains all about the Bucharest Subway